John Gladstone may refer to:
 Sir John Gladstone, 1st Baronet (1764–1851), British politician, father of British Prime Minister William Ewart Gladstone
 Sir John Gladstone, 3rd Baronet (1852–1926)
 Sir John Gladstone, 4th Baronet (1855–1945)
 John Neilson Gladstone (1807–1863), British politician, brother of British Prime Minister W. E. Gladstone
 John Hall Gladstone (1827–1902), chemist and winner of the Davy Medal in 1897
 John Gladstone (bishop) (born 1945), Anglican bishop in India